Bir Lahmar is a town and commune in the Tataouine Governorate, Tunisia. As of 2004 it had a population of 8,418.
It is surrounded by the mountains of Djebel Dahar to the west and the coastal plain of Djeffara to the east. 

As the name implies ("red well" in Arabic), the city developed around a source of water, a precious element in a desert region traditionally traveled by caravans.

See also
List of cities in Tunisia

References

Populated places in Tataouine Governorate
Communes of Tunisia
Tunisia geography articles needing translation from French Wikipedia